Heliosia jucunda is a moth of the family Erebidae. It was described by Francis Walker in 1854. It is found in the Australian states of Queensland and New South Wales.

References

 

Nudariina
Moths described in 1854